Stage results and recaps of the 2007 Vuelta a España from Stage 1 to Stage 11.

Stages

Stage 1 - September 1, 2007: Vigo > Vigo, 145 km.

Stage 2 - September 2, 2007: Allariz > Santiago de Compostela, 150 km.

Stage 3 - September 3, 2007: Viveiro > Luarca, 155 km.

Stage 4 - September 4, 2007: Langreo > Lagos de Covadonga, 182 km.

Stage 5 - September 5, 2007: Cangas de Onís > Reinosa, 155 km.

Stage 6 - September 6, 2007: Reinosa > Logroño, 195 km.

Stage 7 - September 7, 2007: Calahorra > Zaragoza, 140 km.

Stage 8 - September 8, 2007: Cariñena > Zaragoza, 49 km. (ITT)

Stage 9 - September 9, 2007: Huesca > Aramón Cerler, 174 km.

Stage 10 - September 10, 2007: Benasque > Ordino Arcalís , 220 km.

Stage 11 (after Rest Day 1) September 12, 2007: Oropesa del Mar > Algemesí, 190 km.

References

External links
cyclingnews

2007 Vuelta a España
2007